The girls' 800 metre freestyle event at the 2018 Summer Youth Olympics took place on 9 October at the Natatorium in Buenos Aires, Argentina.

Results
The heats were started at 10:00 and 18:00.

References

Swimming at the 2018 Summer Youth Olympics